Herbert Lee Hyde (December 12, 1925 – October 15, 2006) was an American lawyer and politician who served in both houses of the North Carolina General Assembly.

References

1925 births
2006 deaths
New York University School of Law alumni
Democratic Party North Carolina state senators
Politicians from Asheville, North Carolina
Western Carolina University alumni